Pkhakadze is a Georgian surname. Notable people with the surname include:
Omar Pkhakadze (1944–1993), Georgian sprint cyclist
Tamri Pkhakadze (born 1957), Georgian writer, playwright, children's author and translator

Georgian-language surnames
Surnames of Georgian origin